Egil Iversen is a Norwegian orienteering competitor. He received a bronze medal in the individual event at the 1985 World Orienteering Championships in Bendigo.

National championships
Iversen became Norwegian champion (individual event) in 1982, and was awarded the King's Cup. He received gold medals in the relay event in 1982, 1983, 1984 and 1985, competing for the club IF Sturla.

References

Year of birth missing (living people)
Living people
Norwegian orienteers
Male orienteers
Foot orienteers
World Orienteering Championships medalists